Red Shoe Diaries is an American anthology erotic drama series that aired on Showtime cable network from 1992 to 1997 and distributed by Playboy Entertainment overseas. It is a spinoff of an earlier film by the same name, also directed by Zalman King. Most episodes were directed by either Zalman King, Rafael Eisenman or both.

The story-lines usually have a thin plot revolving around some intrigue and the sexual awakening of a girl or woman who often also narrates. Sensuous love scenes with nudity as well as sultry, moody music are characteristic for most episodes. There is no story arc or characters connecting the different stories other than Jake Winters introducing each episode.

Synopsis
The tested episodes always open with a quick montage of a newspaper personals section ad under "Red Shoes" seeking women to mail in their personal diaries with stories of love, passion and/or betrayal. The presenter and host Jake Winters (David Duchovny) is then shown walking on desolate train tracks with his dog Stella. He begins reading a letter from his post office box out loud that begins with "Dear Red Shoes..." He first took out the ad after the suicide of his fiancée, and his subsequent confrontation of the man with whom she was having an affair, a construction worker and shoe salesman who sold her a pair of red high heels, inspiring the ad. He placed the ad in the newspaper in an effort to understand why it happened and learn his fiancée's reasons for killing herself through the stories of women in similar situations.

Episodes

Season 1 (1992)

Season 2 (1993)

Season 3 (1994)

Season 4 (1995)

Season 5 (1996)

Release

Syndication
Red Shoe Diaries episodes were running on the Canadian television channel Showcase, early Saturday morning, as of August 2010. From time to time, episodes can also be viewed on Showtime. A few episodes can be viewed on Amazon Video or hulu.com. This show is also on Tubi, a free streaming service. Originally screened in the UK on Channel 5 back in the 1990's, the channel screened several episodes back-to-back on August 30th, 2021.

Home media
After the 1992 release of the pilot movie, episodes from the series were compiled on VHS, Laserdisc, and DVD as branded Red Shoe Diaries movies. Each compilation features three episodes.

 Red Shoe Diaries (1992). Director: Zalman King. Stars: David Duchovny, Brigitte Bako, Billy Wirth
 Red Shoe Diaries 2: Double Dare. "Safe Sex" / "You Have the Right to Remain Silent" / "Double Dare"
 Red Shoe Diaries 3: Another Woman's Lipstick. "Just Like That" / "Another Woman's Lipstick" / "Talk to Me Baby"  
 Red Shoe Diaries 4: Auto Erotica. "Accidents Happen" / "Auto Erotica" / "Jake's Story"
 Red Shoe Diaries 5: Weekend Pass. "Double or Nothing" / "Bounty Hunter" / "Weekend Pass"
 Red Shoe Diaries 6: How I Met My Husband. "How I Met My Husband" / "Naked in the Moonlight" / "Midnight Bells"
 Red Shoe Diaries 7: Burning Up. "Runway" / "Kidnap" / "Burning Up"
 Red Shoe Diaries 8: Night of Abandon. "Night of Abandon" / "Liar's Tale" / "In the Blink of an Eye"
 Red Shoe Diaries 9: Hotline. "Gina" / "Hotline" / "Love at First Sight" 
 Red Shoe Diaries 10: Some Things Never Change. "You Make Me Want to Wear Dresses" / "Some Things Never Change" / "Alphabet Girl"
 Red Shoe Diaries 11: The Game. "The Game" / "The Cake" / "Like Father, Like Son"
 Red Shoe Diaries 12: Girl on a Bike. "Girl on a Bike" / "Written Word" / "Borders of Salt"
 Red Shoe Diaries 13: Four on the Floor. "The Psychiatrist" / "Four on the Floor" / "Emily's Dance"
 Red Shoe Diaries 14: Luscious Lola. "Luscious Lola" / "The Last Motel" / "Mercy"
 Red Shoe Diaries 15: Forbidden Zone. "Forbidden Zone" / "The Art of Loneliness" / "The Picnic"
 Red Shoe Diaries 16: Temple of Flesh. "Temple of Flesh" / "Juarez" / "The Farmer's Daughter"
 Red Shoe Diaries 17: Swimming Naked. "Swimming Naked" / "Jump" / "Tears"
 Red Shoe Diaries 18: Strip Poker. "Strip Poker" / "Slow Train" / "Hard Labor"
 Red Shoe Diaries 19: As She Wishes. "As She Wishes" / "Billy Bar" / "Weightless"
 Red Shoe Diaries 20: Caged Bird. "Caged Bird" / "The Ex" / "The Teacher"
On June 17, 2014, Kino Lorber released Season One on DVD in Region 1 for the very first time.  On the same day they also re-released Red Shoe Diaries - The Movie.

Second Red Shoe Diaries TV pilot
In 2006, Zalman King wrote and directed a second, feature-length Red Shoe Diaries TV pilot. This pilot was completed but never aired.

References

External links
 
 
 

Showtime (TV network) original programming
1990s American anthology television series
1992 American television series debuts
1997 American television series endings
Erotic television series
Nudity in television
Showcase (Canadian TV channel) original programming
Television series by CBS Studios
English-language television shows
Films directed by Zalman King